Cheng Siu Chung (born 29 September 1972 in Hong Kong) is a Hong Kong football manager and former professional player. He is currently the head coach of Hong Kong Premier League club Southern.

He served as a commentator for the 2010 FIFA World Cup for the Cantonese subscription television network, Astro Wah Lai Toi.

Club career
Cheng moved to Costa Rica when he was 8 years old along with his parents and sister, and is fluent in Spanish and English as well as his native Cantonese. His father, Cheng Kwok Kan, was a famous footballer in Hong Kong who played for Happy Valley before moving to Costa Rica. Cheng Siu Chung started his career in Costa Rica where he also represented Costa Rica for the youth level.

In 1994, Alajuelense sold Cheng to Eastern for a then record transfer fee of HK$234,000. It has been the highest transfer fee record in Hong Kong First Division League. The record stood until 2007 when South China bought Chan Wai Ho from Hong Kong Rangers by HK$400,000.

Managerial career
While serving a coach at Kitchee, also played for Southern which at the time were in the Hong Kong Third District Division League.

On 7 May 2015, Kitchee announced on Facebook that Cheng had been hired by Southern as their new manager after the district club announced that they would seek a license to compete in the 2015-16 Hong Kong Premier League.

After five seasons, Cheng departed Southern on 16 March 2020 after a falling out with Southern's upper management. He failed to win any trophies for Southern during his spell with the club.

On 13 June 2022, Cheng returned to Southern as the club's new head coach.

Honours

Player

Club 
Alajuelense
Liga FPD: 1991, 1992

Eastern
Hong Kong First Division: 1994–95

Instant-Dict
Hong Kong First Division: 1997–98
Hong Kong FA Cup: 1996–97, 1997–98, 2000–01

South China
Hong Kong First Division: 1999–2000
Hong Kong Senior Shield: 1998–99, 1999–2000, 2001–02
Hong Kong FA Cup: 1998–99, 2001–02

Happy Valley
Hong Kong First Division: 2002–03

Individual 
Hong Kong Footballer of the Year: 1996

Assistant manager
Kitchee
Hong Kong Premier League: 2014–15
Hong Kong First Division: 2010–11, 2011–12, 2013–14
Hong Kong FA Cup: 2011–12, 2012–13, 2014–15
Hong Kong League Cup: 2011–12, 2014–15

References 

Living people
Hong Kong footballers
Hong Kong international footballers
Association football forwards
Hong Kong emigrants to Costa Rica
Costa Rican people of Hong Kong descent
Liga FPD players
Hong Kong First Division League players
South China AA players
L.D. Alajuelense footballers
Happy Valley AA players
Kitchee SC players
Double Flower FA players
Hong Kong football managers
1972 births
Costa Rica under-20 international footballers
Costa Rican footballers
Hong Kong League XI representative players